Armenochori is an Armenian village located in the Limassol District of Cyprus,  northeast of the city of Limassol. Armenochori means “Armenian village” in Greek. In 1958, the Turkish Cypriots adopted the alternative name Esenköy, literally meaning “windy village.”

History

Ancient

Armenochori is one of the oldest villages of Limassol District. Early signs of inhabitation is known to be dated to 85BC, when the emperor of Armenia named Tigranes the Great, son of Khoren the Great III, ( Tigran Mets;  Tigránes o Mégas) had conquered Syria, Lebanon, parts of Israel, Anatolia and Cyprus. Part of Tigranes' army remained in Cyprus in order to guarantee the security of the Greek population of the island against aggressive Arabians. 
After continuing  his achievements throughout the middle east, Tigran orders some of his leading military personnel to stay behind in the areas of modern Armenochori to monitor developments of agreements of protection of local Greek allies. The area of Armenochori was strategically convenient to watch over the Mediterranean horizon and stay alarm against possible invasions by enemies.

Ancient history says:

Ottoman Period

Armenochori/Esenköy was turned into a Turkish Cypriot village during the Ottoman period. Although some Greek Cypriot and Armenian families lived there between 1891 and 1931, almost all of them left the village by the 1940s. Over the course of the British period, the population of the village doubled, rising from 89 persons in 1891 to 162 in 1960.

Modern
As a result of the Armenian Genocide under Ottoman Empire in early 1900s, Armenians from Adana, Taşucu, and other coastal cities of Anatolia managed to escape to Cyprus and find refuge in their historic village. Today the village is the choice of residence of wealthy businessmen from Cyprus, Russia, Armenia and other countries. It has a population of 187 people.

References

Communities in Limassol District